Bialetti may refer to:

 Alfonso Bialetti (1888-1970), Italian engineer and entrepreneur
 Bialetti, Italian manufacturer company founded by Alfonso Bialetti 
 Bialetti Moka Express, a product manufactured by the Bialetti Industries
 Bialetti Montecatini, a professional basketball team based in Montecatini Terme, Tuscany, Italy